Patricia "Trish" Adudu is a British freelance journalist and television presenter.

Career
In the 1990s Adudu was a regular contributor, reporter and presenter for BBC GLR 94.9fm. When the Talk Radio UK launched in 1995, she appeared on a number of shows across the schedule, usually contributing to discussion on sport.
Adudu was an original member of the Loose Women panel appearing from 1999 to 2002. She worked as a Media Teacher at Henley College in Coventry, before leaving in 2014. Since June 2014, Adudu has been presenting some weekend editions of Midlands Today.

She currently presents the Weekday Afternoon programme from 14:00 - 18:00 on BBC CWR, the BBC Local Radio service for Coventry and Warwickshire.

Personal life
She has two sons and her parents are Jamaican and Nigerian immigrants.

References

External links 

Trish at BBC Coventry & Warwickshire

1969 births
Living people
English people of Nigerian descent
English people of Jamaican descent
Television personalities from Bristol
Black British television personalities
English journalists
People educated at Barr's Hill School